Euoplos festivus is a species of armoured trapdoor spider in the family Idiopidae. It is found in Western Australia.

References 

Idiopidae
Spiders described in 1918
Spiders of Australia